The North Staffordshire Railway (NSR) M Class was a class of 0-4-4T steam locomotive designed by John H. Adams, third son of William Adams. It was designed for suburban passenger work on the potteries loop lines. They shared components such as a drumhead smokebox which rested on the saddle and an almost identical boiler with the NSR L class. The boiler of the M class later became a standard boiler for the NSR, it being used on the NSR's New L class and H class. The M class introduced a new form of cab roof which curved around to join the cab sides, as with the Midland Railway at the time, and was soon copied by the SE&CR. Five were built between 1907 and 1908 at the NSR's Stoke Works and withdrawals taking place between 1930 and 1939. None survived into preservation.

All entered the London, Midland and Scottish Railway (LMS) stock upon formation in 1923 with little modification, other than replacing the original Ramsbottom safety valves with Ross-pop type. With the LMS' policy of standardisation, many NSR classes were prime targets for early scrapping due to the small size of the classes. As a result, all save one was withdrawn by 1936, having been displaced by more modern six-coupled tanks. This last locomotive had the distinction of being the last NSR locomotive to remain in service save for a battery electric shunting engine, but by the final days was itself reduced to shunting duties.

The livery of the M class was the NSR's Madder Lake with straw lining, and NORTH STAFFORD lettering on the side tanks along with the company crest. The number appeared on the bunker. In LMS days all received the crimson lake passenger livery of the early LMS with large numerals on the side tanks and the company crest on the bunker, but by 1928 they were repainted in plain black with L M S written on the tanks and number on the bunker.

List of locomotives

References

North Staffordshire Railway
Steam locomotives of Great Britain